"Asphalt Lady" (Japanese: アスファルト・レディ) is the second single by Kiyotaka Sugiyama & Omega Tribe, released by VAP on October 21, 1983. The single peaked at No. 34 on the Oricon charts.

The song was included in the second album River's Island released on March 21, 1984, though it was a longer version on the album. The single also includes the B-Side "AD 1959," recorded before debuting as Omega Tribe for the first album, Aqua City.

Track listing

Charts

References 

1983 singles
Japanese songs
1983 songs
Omega Tribe (Japanese band) songs
Songs with lyrics by Chinfa Kan
Songs written by Tetsuji Hayashi